The 1910 Central University football team represented Central University—now known as Centre College as an independent during the 1910 college football season. Led by second-year head coach M. B. Banks, the team went undefeated, beating Tennessee, Tulane, and Sewanee. The team claimed an SIAA title, since Vanderbilt did not play them.

Schedule

References

Central University
Centre Colonels football seasons
College football undefeated seasons
Central University football